Napoleon is a musical by Timothy Williams and Andrew Sabiston.

Productions 
It premiered at the Elgin Theatre in Toronto on 23 March 1994 with Jérôme Pradon in the title role and Aline Mowat as leading lady Joséphine de Beauharnais. Directed by John Wood and orchestrated by David Cullen. It was nominated for a Dora Award for Best Musical.

The musical had a second production at the Shaftesbury Theatre in London's West End with previews from 30 September 2000. It officially opened on 13 October 2000, and starred Paul Baker and Uwe Kröger (who performed three of the eight a week in the title role), with Anastasia Barzee as Josephine. It was directed by Francesca Zambello and produced by Duncan C. Weldon. The orchestrations were by Jonathan Tunick. The London production ran for six months.

Work on a new version of the musical began in 2009 when director Richard Ouzounian helmed a concert version in Barrie, Ontario with the story narrated by the character Talleyrand, the political mastermind who helped shape Napoleon's career. The concert starred Adam Brazier, Blythe Wilson, and Chip Mitchell.

This marked the beginning of a reimagining of the musical as a behind-the-scenes political drama and a new book and score. The new Napoleon opened at the New York Musical Theatre Festival in July 2015 under the direction of Richard Ouzounian. Modern parallels with the making of leaders today figure strongly in the narrative, in which Napoleon as a young and promising rising star is discovered, latched onto, then managed and manipulated. The story charts Talleyrand's pride in taking a common man and placing him on the throne of an empire vaster than Rome. His machinations impact every aspect of Napoleon's journey, over which Talleyrand sees himself as the master. But what Talleyrand isn't prepared for is Napoleon's sheer force of character, and his obsession with Josephine. It received glowing reviews.

In July, 2017, a lavish new production of Napoleon opened at the Charlotte Theater in Seoul for a limited three-month season. It featured a cast of 54 including B.A.P's Daehyun and BTOB's Changsub alongside famous musical actors such as Lim Tae Kyung, Michael Lee, and Han Ji Sang. It was directed by Richard Ouzounian and features new sets, costumes, projections, orchestrations and was translated into Korean. It received glowing reviews.

Authors
Timothy Williams is a multi-award-winning composer and orchestrator for theatre, film, and video games. Film highlights include Wild Horses, written and directed by Robert Duvall, (Robert Duvall, James Franco and Josh Hartnett), Walking With the Enemy (Ben Kingsley), I.T., directed by John Moore and starring Pierce Brosnan, The Mulberry Tree (Joe Morton), Red Sky (Rachael Leigh Cook and Bill Pullman), Debug (Jason Momoa), and Beyond All Boundaries (Tom Hanks, Brad Pitt). He has written additional music for and/or orchestrated/conducted over 60 films including Get Out, Guardians of the Galaxy, Guardians of the Galaxy Vol. 2, Hidden Figures, It, Sucker Punch, Watchmen, The Day the Earth Stood Still, and 300. For Disney and Universal, his live theatrical works include adaptations and orchestrations of Aladdin (book by Chad Beguelin), Wicked (for Tokyo), Tangled - The Musical and thirty other shows directed by Gordon Greenberg, Joe Calarco and Eric Schaeffer. He recently arranged the songs for up and coming artist Zella Day. He has won a Dora Award and three Thea awards.

Andrew Sabiston is a writer, series developer, executive story editor and performer in the children's/youth television market with over 900 episodes to his credit. Many of the programs in which he has been involved are multiple award-winners airing globally and include: Little Bear; Max & Ruby; Mike the Knight; Arthur; Justin Time; Trucktown; Bo On the Go; My Big Big Friend; The Moblees; Little Charmers; The Adventures of Napkin Man; Donkey Kong Country, The Neverending Story; Droids, Super Mario Brothers; Harry and His Bucket Full of Dinosaurs; Babar and Badou, and The Travels of the Young Marco Polo. A 2015 Canadian Screen Award Nominee for Best Writing, he also had three of his scripts nominated for Best Series in various categories in the 2015 Youth Media Alliance Awards.

Plot
The plot of the Toronto and London productions centered on Napoleon Bonaparte's rise from a common man to the leader of France and his relationship to his first wife, Joséphine de Beauharnais.

In the 2015 version the story is told through the eyes of Talleyrand, whose machinations and deceptions help to both make and destroy his political protégé.

Recordings
The original cast recording of Napoleon was released by EMI Angel Broadway and has become a cult item. A bonus track was recorded by Dan Hill and reached number 16 on the Canadian charts. Songs from Napoleon have been covered by Dan Hill, Stig Rossen, Uwe Kröger, Stephanie Martin, Adam Brazier, and Blythe Wilson.

The song "Sweet Victory Divine" was covered by Stig Rossen on his album The Impossible Dream.

In 2001, First Night Records released a 5-track Cast Recording of the Original London Cast. Re-orchestrated, it features only one new song ("Only In Fantasy"), sung by Anastasia Barzee. The entire full score with the large orchestra was recorded and is available for listening on the official website, but unfortunately due to union contracts and payment issues, the cast recording remains unreleased for purchasing.

Also in 2001, Uwe Kröger recorded the song "Sweet Victory Divine", Napoleon's Act 1 Finale, for the CD version of the concert So In Love With Musicals, which also starred Pia Douwes.

In 2009, to mark the 15th anniversary of the Toronto production, the original 1994 cast album with Jérôme Pradon and Aline Mowat was released by Stage Door Records (UK), with 15 tracks. The original release was 18 tracks.

Songs were recently incorporated into Field of Dreams and Anthology of Canadian Musicals. Excerpts can frequently be heard on Radio programs hosted by Richard Ouzounian in Canada and Elaine Paige in England.

References

External links
 Napoleon Official Site
 Timothy Williams Official Site
 Andrew Sabiston Official Site
 NAPOLEON - 15th Year Anniversary CD

 Canadian Musical Theatre Data Base - NAPOLEON: specs, videos, song samples and reviews

1994 musicals
West End musicals
Canadian musicals
Plays about Napoleon
Cultural depictions of Joséphine de Beauharnais
Cultural depictions of Charles Maurice de Talleyrand-Périgord